Samye, full name Samye Mighur Lhundrub Tsula Khang (Wylie: Bsam yas mi ’gyur lhun grub gtsug lag khang) and Shrine of Unchanging Spontaneous Presence is the first Tibetan Buddhist and Nyingma monastery built in Tibet, during the reign of King Trisong Deutsen. Shantarakshita began construction around 763, and Vajrayana founder Guru Padmasambhava tamed the local spirits for its completion in 779. The first Tibetan monks were ordained there. Samye was destroyed during the Cultural Revolution then rebuilt after 1988.

Samye Monastery is located in the Chimpu valley (Mchims phu), south of Lhasa, next the Hapori mountain, in the Yarlung Valley. The site is in the present administrative region of Gra Nang or Drananga Lhoka.

History

According to the Blue Annals, completed in 1476, the temple was constructed between 787 and 791 under the patronage of King Trisong Detsen. Earlier in date is the Testament of Ba, the oldest account of the construction of the temple. This records that the foundations were laid in the 'Hare Year'. This corresponds to 763 or 775, with the completion and consecration of the main shrine taking place in the 'Sheep Year'. This is thought to correspond to 779.

The plan was supposedly modeled on the design of Odantapuri in what is now Bihar, India. The arrangement of the temple with a main shrine in the middle with fours shrines, each with a different color representing the cardinal points, and the whole surrounded by a circular wall, represents the Buddhist universe as three dimensional mandala. This idea is found in a number of temples of the period in South East Asia and East Asia such as the Tōdai-ji in Japan. As at the Tōdai-ji, the Samye temple is dedicated to Vairocana. A seminal text of Vairocana is the Mahavairocana Tantra, composed in India in the seventh century and translated into Chinese and Tibetan soon after. The history of Samye is dealt with in this section; for the art and architectural features and their history, see below.  

The Samye pillar or རྡོ་རིང་ and its inscription

There are many traditions about Samye compiled after the tenth century. One of the few documents belonging to the eighth century proper—but not carrying an actual date—is an inscription on the stone pillar (རྡོ་རིང་) preserved in front of the temple. This records the building of temples at Lhasa and Brag Mar (i.e. Samye), and that the king, ministers and other nobles made solemn oaths to preserve and protect the endowments of the monastery. The term used for these endowments is 'necessities' or 'meritorious gifts' (Tib. ཡོ་བྱད་ Sanskrit deyadharma).

The Samye bell inscription

A second dynastic record at Samye is on the large bronze bell in the entrance to the temple. This gives an account of the making of the bell by one of the queens of King Trisong Detsen. The text has been translated as follows:
"Queen Rgyal mo brtsan, mother and son, made this bell in order to
worship the Three Jewels of the ten directions. And [they] pray that, by the
power of that merit, Lha Btsan po Khri Srong lde brtsan, father and son,
husband and wife, may be endowed with the harmony of the sixty
melodious sounds, and attain supreme enlightenment."

Histories of Samye after the Dynastic Period

According to post-dynastic accounts such as the Testament of Ba and other accounts, such as that compiled by Bsod-nams-rgyal-mtshan (1312-1374), the Indian monk Śāntarakṣita made the first attempt to construct the monastery while promoting his sutra-centric version of Buddhism. Finding the Samye site auspicious, he set about to build a structure there. However, the building would always collapse after reaching a certain stage. Terrified, the construction workers believed that there was a demon or obstructive tulku in a nearby river making trouble.

When Shantarakshita's contemporary Padmasambhava arrived from northern India, he was able to subdue the energetic problems obstructing the building of Samye. According to the 5th Dalai Lama, Padmasambhava performed the Vajrakilaya dance and enacted the rite of namkha to assist Trisong Detsen and Śāntarakṣita clear away obscurations and hindrances in the building of Samye: 

The abovementioned quotation makes reference to the relationship of the kīla to the stupa and mentions torma and namkha. Moreover, the building of Samye marked the foundation of the original school of Tibetan Buddhism, the Nyingma. This helps explain how Padmasambhava's Tantra-centric version of Buddhism gained ascendance over the sutra-based teaching of Śāntarakṣita.

Pearlman succinctly charts the origin of the institution of the Nechung Oracle:

The Great Debate

One of the key events in the history of Samye was the debate between Buddhist schools hosted by Trisong Detsen in the 790s. Adamek (2007: p. 288) provides a circa five-year range when Moheyan of the East Mountain Teaching of Chan Buddhism and Kamalaśīla may have debated at Samye in Tibet:

Broughton identifies the Chinese and Tibetan nomenclature of Moheyan's teachings and identifies them principally with the East Mountain Teaching:

The great debate of the Council of Lhasa between the two principal debators or dialecticians, Moheyan and Kamalaśīla is narrated and depicted in a specific cham dance once held annually at Kumbum Monastery in Qinghai.

Influences

The 18th century Puning Temple built by the Qianlong Emperor of Qing China in Chengde, Hebei was modeled after Samye.

Architectural features of the monastery and their history
Samye Monastery is laid out on the shape of a giant mandala; in its center lies the main temple representing the legendary Mount Meru. Other buildings stand at the corners and cardinal points of the main temple, representing continents and other features of tantric Buddhist cosmology.

In corners are 4 chörtens - white, red, green (or blue) and black.
There are 8 main temples:
 Dajor ling བརྡ་སྦྱོར་གླིང་ (brda sbyor gling)
 Dragyar ling སྒྲ་བསྒྱར་གླིང་ (sgra bsgyar gling)
 Bétsa ling བེ་ཙ་གླིང་ (be tsa gling)
 Jampa ling བྱམས་པ་གླིང་ (byams pa gling)
 Samten ling བསམ་གཏན་གླིང་ (bsam gtan gling)
 Natsok ling སྣ་ཚོགས་གླིང་ (sna tshogs gling)
 Düdül ling བདུད་འདུལ་གླིང་ (bdud 'dul gling)
 Tamdrin ling རྟ་མགྲིན་གླིང་ (rta mgrin gling)

The original buildings have long disappeared. They have been badly damaged several times — by civil war in the 11th century, fires in the mid 17th century and in 1826, an earthquake in 1816, and in the 20th century, particularly during the Cultural Revolution. As late as the late 1980s pigs and other farm animals were allowed to wander through the sacred buildings. Heinrich Harrer quoted his own words he said to the 14th Dalai Lama of what he saw in 1982 from his airplane en route to Lhasa,  Each time it has been rebuilt, and today, largely due to the efforts of Choekyi Gyaltsen, 10th Panchen Lama from 1986 onward, it is again an active monastery and important pilgrimage and tourist destination.

Recent events

Imprisonment and suicide
In 2009, the Tibetan Centre for Human Rights and Democracy (TCHRD) reports that, according to the information they have received, nine monks studying at Samye Monastery had been sentenced to prison terms varying from two to fifteen years for participating in the protest on 15 March 2008 held at the Samye government administrative headquarters in Dranang County. The monks were joined by hundreds of Tibetans demanding religious freedom, human rights for Tibetans and the return of the Dalai Lama to Tibet. They were held at the Lhoka Public Security Bureau (PSB) Detention Centre.

The TCHRD also reported that on 19 March 2008, a visiting scholar from Dorje Drak Monastery, Namdrol Khakyab, committed suicide, leaving a note speaking of unbearable suppression by the Chinese regime, citing the innocence of other monks of the monastery, and taking full responsibility for the protest.

Statue of Padmasambhava dismantled by Chinese Authorities
In May 2007, a 30 ft (9 metre) gold and copper plated statue of Guru Rinpoche, known as Padmasambhava, at Samye Gompa, and apparently funded by two Chinese devotees from Guangzhou in the southern Chinese province of Guangdong, was reportedly demolished by Chinese authorities.

See also
Cham dance

Gallery

Notes

References
 Dorje, Gyurme. (1999). Footprint Tibet Handbook with Bhutan. 2nd Edition. Footprint Handbooks Ltd. .
 Dowman, Keith. (1988) The Power-places of Central Tibet. Routledge & Kegan Paul. London & New York. .
 Rene de Nebesky-Wojkowitz, Tibetan Religious Dances (The Hague:Mouton, 1976)
 Yeshe Tsogyel, The Life and Liberation of Padmasambhava, 2 vols., trans. Kenneth Douglas and Gwendolyn Bays (Berkeley:  Dharma Publishing, 1978)
 Pearlman, Ellen (2002). Tibetan Sacred Dance:  a journey into the religious and folk traditions. Rochester, Vermont, USA:  Inner Traditions.  
 Luke Wagner and Ben Deitle (2007). Samyé

External links 

 Samye Monastery - Sacred Destinations
 Samye - by Travel China guide

770s establishments
Religious organizations established in the 8th century
Buddhist temples in Shannan, Tibet
Nyingma monasteries and temples
Sakya monasteries and temples
Shannan, Tibet
Major National Historical and Cultural Sites in Tibet
Buddhist schools in Tibet